Marginellidae, or the margin shells, are a taxonomic family of small, often colorful, sea snails, marine gastropod molluscs in the clade Neogastropoda.

Taxonomy 
The higher classification of the family Marginellidae has long been in a state of confusion. Many popular works still treat all members of this family under the single genus Marginella, basing them primarily on superficial similarities of the shell.

The confusion over the classification stems from the fact that the earlier classifications were based rather crudely on shell characters. Although many good differential shell characters do exist within this group, those characters were generally misinterpreted or not recognized as significant. Such information as did exist on the radulae and the external anatomy of the living animals was widely scattered in the scientific literature, and internal anatomical descriptions were not available until fairly recently.

In 2019 a new molecular phylogeny of marginelliform gastropods has been established by Fedosov A.E., Caballer Gutierrez M., Buge B., Sorokin P.V., Puillandre N., Bouchet P.

Shell description
The shell of Marginellidae is usually small, but varies in different species from minute to medium-sized.
The external color of the shell can be white, cream, yellow, orange, red, or brown, and can be uniformly colored, or patterned in various ways. The protoconch is paucispiral. The lip of the shell is thickened, and can be smooth or denticulate. An external varix may be present or absent, a siphonal notch may be present or absent. The columella may have 2-6 plications. The operculum is absent in this family.

Genera
Subfamily Austroginellinae G. A. Coovert & H. K. Coovert, 1995
Alaginella Laseron, 1957
Austroginella Laseron, 1957
Caribeginella Espinosa & Ortea, 1998
Hydroginella Laseron, 1957
Marigordiella Espinosa & Ortea, 2010
Mesoginella Laseron, 1957
Ovaginella Laseron, 1957
Protoginella Laseron, 1957
Serrata Jousseaume, 1875
Subfamily Marginellinae Fleming, 1828
Dentimargo Cossmann, 1899
Eratoidea Weinkauff, 1879
Gibbacousteau Espinosa & Ortea, 2013
Glabella Swainson, 1840
Marginella Lamarck, 1799
Nudifaba Eames, 1952 †
Stazzania Sacco, 1890 †
Subfamily Pruninae G. A. Coovert & H. K. Coovert, 1995
Balanetta Jousseaume, 1875
Bullata Jousseaume, 1875
Closia Gray, 1857
Cryptospira Hinds, 1844
Hyalina Schumacher, 1817
Mirpurina Ortea, Moro & Espinosa, 2019
Prunum Herrmannsen, 1852
Rivomarginella Brandt, 1968
Volvarina Hinds, 1844
Subfamily Incertae sedis
Demissa Boyer, 2016

Synonyms
 Granulininae G. A. Coovert & H. K. Coovert, 1995: synonym of Granulinidae G. A. Coovert & H. K. Coovert, 1995 (original rank)
 Marginelloninae Coan, 1965: synonym of Marginellonidae Coan, 1965 (original rank)
 Carinaginella Laseron, 1957: synonym of Alaginella Laseron, 1957
 Cassoginella Laseron, 1957 †: synonym of Alaginella Laseron, 1957
 Deviginella Laseron, 1957: synonym of Mesoginella Laseron, 1957
 Haloginella Laseron, 1957: synonym of Serrata Jousseaume, 1875
 Neptoginella Laseron, 1957: synonym of Hydroginella Laseron, 1957
 Pillarginella Gabriel, 1962: synonym of Hydroginella Laseron, 1957
 Plicaginella Laseron, 1957: synonym of Austroginella Laseron, 1957
 Serrataginella G. A. Coovert & H. K. Coovert, 1995: synonym of Serrata Jousseaume, 1875
 Sinuginella Laseron, 1957: synonym of Mesoginella Laseron, 1957
 Spiroginella Laseron, 1957: synonym of Mesoginella Laseron, 1957
 Triginella Laseron, 1957: synonym of Alaginella Laseron, 1957
 Cucumis "Klein": synonym of Marginella Lamarck, 1799 (unavailable name)
 Faba P. Fischer, 1883: synonym of Glabella Swainson, 1840 (objective synonym of Glabella)
 Longinella Laseron, 1957: synonym of Dentimargo Cossmann, 1899 (preoccupied by Longinella Gros & Lestage, 1927 [Ephemeroptera])
 Marginellarius Duméril, 1805: synonym of Marginella Lamarck, 1799
 Marginellus Montfort, 1810: synonym of Marginella Lamarck, 1799 (unjustified emendation of Marginella)
 Porcellana Gray, 1847: synonym of Marginella Lamarck, 1799 (invalid: junior homonym of Porcellana Lamarck, 1801 [Crustacea])
 Pseudomarginella Maltzan, 1880: synonym of Marginella Lamarck, 1799
 Volvarinella Habe, 1951: synonym of Dentimargo Cossmann, 1899
 Egouana: synonym of Egouena Jousseaume, 1875: synonym of Prunum Herrmannsen, 1852 (invalid: incorrect alternative original spelling)
 Egouena Jousseaume, 1875: synonym of Prunum Herrmannsen, 1852
 Gibberulina Monterosato, 1884: synonym of Bullata Jousseaume, 1875
 Leptegouana Woodring, 1928: synonym of Prunum Herrmannsen, 1852
 Porcellanella Conrad, 1863 †: synonym of Prunum Herrmannsen, 1852 ( invalid: junior homonym of Porcellanella White, 1852 [Crustacea].)
 Volutella Swainson, 1831: synonym of Bullata Jousseaume, 1875 (invalid: junior homonym of Volutella Perry, 1810 [Vasidae])

References

Further reading 
  1853. In: 1853-1858. The genera of Recent Mollusca; arranged according to their organization. John van Voorst, London. 3 vols [1:vi-xl, 1-484; 2:1-661; 3:pls. 1-138].
 
 1962. A new genus in the family Marginellidae. Proceedings of the Malacological Society of London 35(1):14-15.
 1963. The family position of Afrivoluta pringlei Tomlin. The Journal of Conchology 25(5):198-199.
  1974. A new species of Cypraea from West Africa and three new species of Marginellidae from the Indian Ocean. The Journal of Conchology 28(4):213-216, pl.8.
  1965. A proposed reclassification of the family Marginellidae. The Veliger 7(3):184-189
 
 1966. The West American Marginellidae. The Veliger 8(4): 276-299, pls. 48-51.
 1976. Status of the genus Hyalina Schumacher, 1817 (Mollusca: Gastropoda). Journal of Moluccan Studies 42(2):217-222.
  1922. On the pseudo-genus Pseudomarginella, v. Maltzan. Proceedings of the Malacological Society of London15(1):3-5.
 
 1969a. On the identity of Criptospira glauca and the related Cryptospira ventricosa, (Gastropoda: Marginellidae). Basteria 33(5-6):85-92.
 1969b. Notes om Marginella spryi. Basteria 39(1-2):23-27.
 1975. Marginella orstomi. A new species from deeper water off the coast of West Africa (gastropoda, Marginellidae). Bulletin Zoologisch Museum, Universiteit von Amsterdam vol.4 No.12
  1972. The genus Rivomarginella (Gastropoda, Marginellidae). Beaufortia 20(263):69-75.
 
 1986a. Type species list. Marginella Marginalia 1(1):1-3.
 1986b. Generic group names. Marginella Marginalia 1(2):5-7.
 1987a. The genus Afrivoluta and a review of the type species Afrivoluta pringlei Tomlin, 1947. Marginella Marginalia 2(1):1-8.
 1987b. Addenda to Afrivoluta paper. Marginella Marginalia 2(6):39
 1987c. Propor usage of the generic names Haloginella, Hyalina, and Volvarina with a diagnosis of the genus Haloginella. Marginella Marginalia 3(1):1-7
 1987d. The external anatomy of two species of Caribbean Marginellidae. Marginella Marginalia 3(5):33-37.
 1988a. Type species of the genera Austroginella and Mesoginella and their synonyms. Marginella Marginalia 4(2/3):9-26.
 1988b. Marginellidae of Florida, Part II. Prunum succinea with a discussion of Prunum and Volvarina. Marginella Marginalia 4(5)_35-42, pl. 1.
  1899. Essaid e paléonconchologie comparée. Cossmann, Paris. Vol. 3, 201 p., pls. 1-8.
  1883 . In: 1880-1887. Manuel de conchyologie et de paléontologie conchyologique ou histoire naturelle des mollusques vivantes et fossiles. Libraire F. Savy, Paris. Vol. 2(fascicule 6):513-608, 1883.
  1989. Le genre Volvarina (Marginellidae) dans la Mediterranée et l´Atlantique du nord est. Bolletino Malacologico 25(5-8):159-182.
 
 1988. The marginellids of São Tomé, West Africa. Journal of Conchology 33(1):1-30, pls. 1-2.
 1992. The Marginellidae of Angola: The genus Volvarina. The Journal of Conchology 34(4):187-198
 1994. The Marginellidae of Angola: The genus Marginella. Journal of Conchology 35:103-119
  1847. A list of the genera of Recent Mollusac, their synonyma and types. Proceedings of the Zoological Society of London, 1847 pt.15[=17]:129-219.
  1991. Rediscovery of Marginellona gigas (Martens, 1904), with notes on the anatomy and systematic position on the subfamily Marginelloninae (Gastropoda: Marginellidae). Nemouria 37:1-19.
  1844. Descriptions of Marginellae collected during the voyage of H.M.S. Sulphur, and from the collection of Mr. Cuming. Proceedings of the Zoological Society of London, 1844 pt. 12[= vol. 14].72-77.
  1875. Coquilles de la famille des marginelles. Monographie. Revue et Magasin de Zoologie, ser.3, 3:164-271, 429-435, pls. 7-8. [Also issued separately, pp. 1–115, pls. 7-8].
  1957. A new classification of the Australian Marginellidae (Mollusca), with a review of species from the Solanderian and Dampierian zoogeographical provinces. Australian Journal of Marine and Freshwater Research 8(3):274-311.
 
 1852. Description of new species of Marginella, with notes on sundry species of Marginella and Cypraea. Annals of the Lyceum of Natural History in New York 5:224-228.
 1870. Catalogue of the known species, recent and fossil, of the family Marginellidae. American Journal of Concholoigy 6(2):215-269.
  1864-1865. Monograph of the genus Marginella. In; Chonchologia Iconica: or illustration of the shells of molluscous animals. Vol. 15, pls. 2-13 [Aug. 1864], pls. 1,14-27, index, errata [Jan. 1865].
  1963. New gastropod genera from the late Upper Cretaceous of East Gulf Coastal *  1846. Monograph of the genus Marginella. In: Thesaurus Conchyliorum, or figures and descriptions of Recent Shells. Sowerby, London. Vol 1(7):239-406, pls.68-78.
 The Academy of Natural Sciences. A Database of Western Atlantic Marine Mollusca
  1904. Pt. B, Anatomisch-systematische untersuchungen einiger Gastropoden, pp. 147–180, pls. 6-9. In: Martens and Thiele. Die beschalten Gastropoden der deutscen Tiefsee-Expedition 1898-1899.
  1947. A new South African volutid. The Journal of Conchology 22(10):244-245
  1878-1879. Die gattungen Marginella und Erato In: Systematisches Conchylien-Cabinet von Martini und Cheminitz. 2nd ed. Bauer and Raspe, Nürnberg. Vol. 5(4):1-166, pls. 1-26.

External links
 Coovert G.A. & Coovert H.K. (1995) Revision of the supraspecific classification of marginelliform gastropods. The Nautilus 109(2-3): 43-110
 Fedosov A.E., Caballer Gutierrez M., Buge B., Sorokin P.V., Puillandre N., Bouchet P. (2019 [20 September). Mapping the missing branch on the neogastropod tree of life: molecular phylogeny of marginelliform gastropods. Journal of Molluscan Studies]

 
Volutoidea
Taxa named by John Fleming (naturalist)